Salwa, an Arabic name meaning "solace", may refer to:

People
Salwa Abdullah (born 1953), Syrian politician
Salwa El-Awa, British academic
Salwa Bakr (born 1949), Egyptian author and critic
Salwa Bughaighis (1964–2014), Libyan human rights and political activist
Salwa El-Deghali, Libyan academic
Salwa al-Jassar, Kuwaiti politician
Sally ("Salwa") Shatila Kader, Lebanese-American peace activist
Salwa Al Katrib (1953–2009), Lebanese singer
Salwa Abu Khadra (born 1929), Palestinian politician and educator 
Princess Salwa Aga Khan (born 1988), American model, wife of Prince Rahim Aga Khan
Salwa Eid Naser (born 1998), Bahraini track sprinter
Salwa Al Neimi, Syrian writer and feminist
Salwa Toko (born 1975), French diversity and digital literacy activist
Salwa Zeidan, Lebanese artist

Places
Salwa, Kuwait, an area in Hawalli Governorate in Kuwait
Salwa Kingdom, an ancient Indian kingdom in the Mahabharata
Salwa, Saudi Arabia, a settlement at the southwest corner of the Gulf of Salwah, endpoint of the Salwa Highway

Other uses
LORAN-C transmitter Salwa
Salwa Canal, proposed shipping route through Saudi Arabia along its border with Qatar
Salwa Judum, an anti-Naxalite movement in Chhattisgarh, India

See also
Gulf of Salwah, the southern portion of the Gulf of Bahrain
Salva (disambiguation)
Salwah, a village in Idlib Governorate, Syria